Barnston is a village on the Wirral Peninsula, in the county of Merseyside, England, situated to the north east of Heswall. Administratively, the village is in the Pensby & Thingwall Ward of the Metropolitan Borough of Wirral and the parliamentary constituency of Wirral West. At the 2001 Census, Barnston had a population of 3,620 (1,700 males, 1,920 females) At the 2011 Census, the population was 947 (501 males, 441 females).

History
Barnston is mentioned in the Domesday Book as Bernestone and comprised two mills, a manor house and a hospital.

Formerly a township in Woodchurch Parish, Wirral Hundred. Barnston's population was 129 in 1801, 239 in 1851, 522 in 1901 and 832 in 1951.

On 24 March 1962, The Beatles performed at the Barnston Women's Institute. It is noted that this was the first time that Brian Epstein put The Beatles into suits for their performances. John Lennon regarded this as the first, and perhaps the ultimate, sellout of their career. The Beatles played here again on Saturday 30 June and Tuesday 25 September 1962.

On 1 April 1974, local government reorganisation in England and Wales resulted in most of Wirral, including Barnston, being transferred from the county of Cheshire to Merseyside.

Geography

Community
Village landmarks include Christchurch parish church, which was opened in 1871, a primary school and the Fox & Hounds public house.

The Barnstondale Centre, originally Scott's Field and known locally as 'The Camp', is set on a  site which includes woodland. It is an all-weather activity centre and charitable trust.

Transport

Rail

People
 E. Chambré Hardman, Irish photographer, lived in Barnston.
 Septimus Francom, English athlete, died in Barnston.
 Leslie Williams, English Anglican priest, incumbent in Barnston.

See also
Listed buildings in Heswall

References

Bibliography

External links
Barnston Village
Barnstondale Centre

Towns and villages in the Metropolitan Borough of Wirral